Jonathan Erlich and Harel Levy were the defending champions but only Erlich competed that year with Jan Siemerink.

Erlich and Siemerink lost in the quarterfinals to André Sá and Glenn Weiner.

Bob Bryan and Mike Bryan won in the final 6–3, 7–5 against Sá and Weiner.

Seeds

  Bob Bryan /  Mike Bryan (champions)
  Justin Gimelstob /  Scott Humphries (first round)
  Wayne Black /  Jim Thomas (first round)
  David Adams /  Michaël Llodra (first round)

Draw

External links
 2001 Miller Lite Hall of Fame Championships Doubles Draw

2001 Hall of Fame Tennis Championships